Lyudmila Vasilyevna Marchenko (20 June 1940 – 23 January 1997) was a Soviet film actress. She appeared in twelve films between 1959 and 1976. She starred in the film A Home for Tanya, which competed for the Palme d'Or at the 1959 Cannes Film Festival.

Selected filmography
 Volunteers (1958)
 White Nights (1959)
 A Home for Tanya (1959)
 Until Next Spring (1960)
 My Little Brother (1962)
 Cook (1965)
 Aybolit-66 (1966)
 Scouts (1968)
 İnsan məskən salır (1968)
 Only "Old Men" Are Going Into Battle (1973)
 Widows (1976)
 Office Romance (1977)
 Say a Word for the Poor Hussar (1980)

References

External links

1940 births
1997 deaths
Soviet film actresses
Burials at Vagankovo Cemetery
Gerasimov Institute of Cinematography alumni